Puig Cornador (Les Llosses) is a mountain of Catalonia, Spain. It has an elevation of 1,229 metres above sea level.

See also
Mountains of Catalonia

References

Mountains of Catalonia